Gwent Healthcare NHS Trust was an NHS Trust in South East Wales.

The Trust was launched in April 1999 through the merger of Glan Hafren, Gwent Community Health and Nevill Hall and District NHS Trusts. It was abolished in October 2009 when the Aneurin Bevan Local Health Board took over both the functions of the NHS Trust and existing Local Health Boards.

The Trust was one of the largest and busiest in the UK with acute hospitals at Newport, Abergavenny and Caerphilly, supported by twenty community hospitals and extensive community, mental health and learning disability services.

It employed 12,500 staff, of whom one thousand were doctors, including 250 consultants and 5,500 nurses, midwives or health visitors.

Hospitals
Headquarters: Llanfrechfa Grange Hospital, Cwmbran
Aberbargoed Hospital, Aberbargoed
Abertillery and District Hospital, Abertillery
Blaenavon Hospital, Blaenavon
Blaina & District Hospital, Blaina
Caerphilly District Miners Hospital, Caerphilly
Chepstow Community Hospital, Chepstow
County Hospital, Pontypool
Ebbw Vale Hospital, Ebbw Vale
Llanfrechfa Grange Hospital, Cwmbran
Maindiff Court Hospital, Abergavenny
Monnow Vale Integrated Health and Social Care Facility, Monmouth
Nevill Hall Hospital, Abergavenny
Oakdale Hospital, Blackwood
Redwood Memorial Hospital, Rhymney
Royal Gwent Hospital, Newport
St Cadoc's Hospital, Caerleon, Newport
St Woolos Hospital, Newport
Tredegar General Hospital, Tredegar
Ysbyty'r Tri Chwm, Ebbw Vale
Ystrad Mynach Hospital, Ystrad Mynach

Defunct Welsh NHS Trusts